Alischirnevalia is a genus of moths belonging to the subfamily Tortricinae of the family Tortricidae.

Species
Alischirnevalia callirrhoa (Meyrick, 1911)

See also
List of Tortricidae genera

References

External links
tortricidae.com

Monotypic moth genera
Eucosmini
Tortricidae genera